A Thousand Times Repent was a Christian deathcore band that was last signed to Tribunal Records, a record label that also holds bands such as He Is Legend, Century, and Prayer for Cleansing. The band released an EP, titled Virtue Has Few Friends, before disbanding, due to losing their drummer and not finding a replacement. The EP has received multiple good reviews.

Musical style
Despite the band labeling themselves metalcore, many believe that deathcore, grindcore, or death metal describes them better.

Members
Last known line-up
 Darsen Avery - vocals (2006-2011) (ex-Downpour)
 Nate Ledford - guitar (2006-2011)
 Chris Dowd - guitar (2006-2011)
 Jeremy Hopkins - bass (2008-2011) (ex-To Bow or to Burn, Call Me Ishmael)

Former members
 Chris Van Valkenburg - guitar (2006-2010)
 Blake Williams - bass (2006-2008)
 Shannon Hill - drums (2006-2011) (Postulate)

Timeline

Discography
 Virtue Has Few Friends (2007; EP)

References

External links
A Thousand Times Repent on Facebook
A Thousand Times Repent on Myspace

Musical groups established in 2006
Musical groups disestablished in 2011
Christian extreme metal groups
American Christian metal musical groups
American death metal musical groups
Metalcore musical groups from Georgia (U.S. state)
American deathcore musical groups